Boreopeltis is an extinct genus of plesioteuthidid cephalopod, with 4 known species.

Species 

 Boreopeltis helgolandiae (Engeser & Reitner, 1985) from the Aptian.

 Boreopeltis sagittata (Naef, 1921) from the Tithonian.
 Boreopeltis smithi (A. Fuchs & Larson, 2011) from the late Cenomanian to ?Santonian of the Sannine Formation in Lebanon.
 Boreopeltis ifrimae (Fuchs, 2021) from the Turonian of Vallecillo, Mexico, has a gladius length of 47 centimeters and is the second-largest known plesioteuthidid after Eromangateuthis soniae.

Formerly assigned species
 Eromangateuthis soniae Fuchs 2019 (previously Boreopeltis soniae Wade, 1993)

References 

Prehistoric cephalopod genera
Fossil taxa described in 1985